Ouder-Amstel Anders is a small local political party in the municipality of Ouder-Amstel in the Netherlands.

Election results

References

External links
 Official website (in Dutch)

Local political parties in the Netherlands
Ouder-Amstel